Wayne Daniel Mapp  (born 12 March 1952) is a former New Zealand National Party politician. He was the Member of Parliament for North Shore from 1996 to 2011. In the first term of the Fifth National Government, he served as Minister of Defence. Prior to his political career Mapp was in the New Zealand Territorial Army and worked as a lawyer and university lecturer.

Early years
He gained his LLB (Hon) at University of Auckland. This was followed by his LLM from University of Toronto and his PhD in International Law from Christ's College, Cambridge in 1988.

He served as an infantry Major in 3rd Auckland (Countess of Ranfurly's Own) and Northland Regiment Royal New Zealand Territorial Army, later specialising in military intelligence.

Mapp was initially a member of the Labour Party and in 1981 he put himself forward for the Labour candidacy for the Roskill electorate. One of 14 contenders he lost out to Phil Goff.

Before entering politics, Mapp practised law and was an associate professor in commercial law at the University of Auckland.

Member of Parliament

Mapp was elected MP for the North Shore seat at the 1996 general election. He was re-elected in that electorate four more times until he retired from Parliament at the 2011 general election.

Early political career 
In Mapp's first term, the National Party formed a coalition government with New Zealand First and Mapp was appointed to the Justice and Foreign Affairs select committees. After the 1999 election, National spent nine years in Opposition. Mapp held various party spokesperson roles including Defence, Justice, Foreign Affairs, Industrial Relations and "political correctness eradication."

In a September 2003 house sitting, Mapp criticised the incumbent government's lack of support for the US-led invasion of Iraq. His comment pertained to New Zealand being "missing in action" in Iraq, John Key echoed support for his statements and this was used in Labour's election advertising in the 2008 New Zealand general election.

Fifth National Government 
Following National's victory in the 2008 general election, Mapp was appointed Minister of Defence, Minister of Research, Science and Technology (later titled Minister of Science and Innovation), Associate Minister for Economic Development and Associate Minister for Tertiary Education.

While Minister of Defence, Mapp oversaw Operation Burnham, a joint military operation undertaken in Afghanistan by the New Zealand Special Air Service with elements of the Afghan Crisis Response Unit and International Security Assistance Force in October 2010. The 2017 book by Nicky Hager and Jon Stephenson, Hit & Run, alleged that New Zealand forces had committed war crimes against civilians in the Naik and Khak Khudday Dad villages. Mapp announced that he had been a source for the book. In 2020, a Government Inquiry found that a child had been killed in Operation Burnham but that the military operation was justified under international law.

On 15 December 2010, Mapp announced he would retire from Parliament at the 2011 general election.

Post-Parliament

On 15 December 2011, in recognition of his term as a Member of the Executive Council of New Zealand, Mapp was granted the right to retain the title The Honourable for the rest of his life.

On 28 February 2012, Mapp was appointed to the New Zealand Law Commission.

In the 2013 New Year Honours, Mapp was appointed a Companion of the Queen's Service Order for services as a member of Parliament.

References

External links

Wayne Mapp MP official site
Profile at National party

1952 births
Living people
20th-century New Zealand lawyers
New Zealand National Party MPs
University of Auckland alumni
Academic staff of the University of Auckland
University of Toronto alumni
New Zealand Army officers
Alumni of Christ's College, Cambridge
Companions of the Queen's Service Order
Members of the New Zealand House of Representatives
New Zealand MPs for Auckland electorates
21st-century New Zealand politicians
New Zealand defence ministers